Richmond—Arthabaska is a federal electoral district in Quebec, Canada, that has been represented in the House of Commons of Canada since 1997.

Geography

The riding, north of the city of Sherbrooke, straddles the Quebec regions of Centre-du-Québec and Estrie. It consists of the Regional County Municipalities (RCM) of Les Sources and Arthabaska and the centre of the RCM of Le Val-Saint-François. It includes in particular the towns of Victoriaville and Val-des-Sources.

The neighbouring ridings are Drummond, Bas-Richelieu—Nicolet—Bécancour, Mégantic—L'Érable, Compton—Stanstead, Sherbrooke, Brome—Missisquoi, and Shefford.

Its population is 100,116, including 82,663 voters, and its area is 3,563 km².

History

The riding was created in 1996 from portions of Drummond, Richmond—Wolfe, Compton—Stanstead and Lotbinière—L'Érable ridings.

There were no territory changes to this riding from the 2012 electoral redistribution.

Members of Parliament

This riding has elected the following Members of Parliament:

Election results

Change from 2000 is based on redistributed results. Conservative Party change is based on the total of Canadian Alliance and Progressive Conservative Party votes.

See also
 List of Canadian federal electoral districts
 Past Canadian electoral districts

References

Campaign expense data from Elections Canada
Riding history from the Library of Parliament
2011 Results from Elections Canada

Notes

Quebec federal electoral districts
Val-des-Sources
Victoriaville
Windsor, Quebec